The National Youth Organisation (EON) was a youth organization in Greece during the years of the Metaxas Regime (1936–1941), established by the regime with the stated goals of helping the youth in the productive spending of their free time and cultivating their national values and cooperative spirit.

Membership
Membership was not mandatory, and—unlike most contemporary political youth organizations in Europe—EON was not affiliated with a political party, but there was widespread successful campaigning by the regime to include the largest part of the youth to EON, and later took over the scouts and other such organizations, although typically membership still remained strictly voluntary. However, only Christians could enroll and Muslims and Jews could not become EON members.

Activities and publication
Some of the activities that EON members were involved in included athletics events, parades and marches, military training, reforestations, recycling.

The official monthly magazine of EON was The Youth.

Symbols
The emblem of EON was a labrys surrounded by laurel wreaths and topped with a royal crown, while the flag of EON was similar to the flag of Greece—featuring a white cross on a blue field- with the emblem of EON charged in the center in gold and the royal crown moved to the upper hoist side quadrant. The motto of EON was "One Nation, One King, One Leader, One Youth".

WWII successor organisations
The EON disbanded in late April 1941 with the start of the German occupation of Greece when some of its former members created the secret occupation resistance/liberation organizations "National Youth Committee" and—the strictly female—"SPITHA" under the leadership of Metaxas' daughter Loukia Metaxa.

See also
Hitler youth
Levente Associations
Opera Nazionale Balilla

References

External links 
 «ή Νεολαία» — official journal of the National Youth Organisation (Εθνική Οργάνωσις Νεολαίας).

Youth organizations based in Greece
4th of August Regime
Fascism in Greece
Greek nationalism
Youth organizations established in 1937
Organizations disestablished in 1941
1937 establishments in Greece
1941 disestablishments in Greece
Ioannis Metaxas
Fascist organizations
Anti-communist organizations
Monarchist organizations